

The Béchereau SRAP T.7 was a French single-engined seven-passenger sesquiplane airliner designed by Louis Béchereau who had designed biplane fighters for SPAD including the SPAD S.VII. The aircraft was built by the Société pour la Réalisation d'Appareils.

Design and development
The T.7 was an inverted Sesquiplane, the lower wing had a longer span than the upper. Forward of the upper wing was an open cockpit for the pilot and mechanic, between the wings was an enclosed cabin for seven passengers. It was powered by a  Salmson 18Cmb inline radial piston engine. The aircraft failed to find any buyers and did not enter production.

Specifications

References

Notes

Bibliography

1920s French airliners
Biplanes with negative stagger
Single-engined tractor aircraft
Aircraft first flown in 1926
Conventional landing gear